Mehdi Ali Mirza (1911, Hyderabad State - 27 October 1961) or M. A. Mirza, was amongst the first generation of formally trained architects in Pakistan. He laid the foundation for the establishment of the profession in the new country. He was also the prime mover behind the Institute of Architects, Pakistan (IAP) which was established in the 1950s. In 1962, he was awarded the Pride of Performance Award after his death.

Early life and career
Mirza was born in 1911 to an officer of the forest service in Hyderabad State, British India.

He taught at the Delhi Polytechnic's department of architecture till 1947, then he migrated to Pakistan.

Mirza was influenced by Frank Lloyd Wright. After arriving in Karachi at independence, he started his career with the Public Works Department in 1947.

In the 1950s, he along with 10 other practising architects including two foreigners; M. A. Ahed, Tajuddin Bhamani, Minoo Mistry, Pir Mohammad, R. S. Rustumjee, H. H. Khan, Abdulhusein M. Thariani, Zahiruddn Khawaja, Bloomfield and Peter Powell., formed the Institute of Architects, Pakistan.

Death
Mirza died of cancer on 27 October 1961 in England.

Awards and recognition
 Pride of Performance Award by the President of Pakistan (1962)
 The Institute of Architects, Pakistan's 'Mehdi Ali Mirza Award' is named after him

Publications
 Mankani, Zain and Shikoh, Murtuza(eds), "Pioneer of Architecture in Pakistan - Architect Mehdi Ali Mirza. Karachi: Arch Press. 2013 978-969-9803-00-0 (monograph)

References

1911 births
1961 deaths
Pakistani architects
Recipients of the Pride of Performance
Pakistani people of Hyderabadi descent